Twizell railway station served the historic village of Twizell, Northumberland, England, from 1861 to 1955 on the Kelso Branch.

History 
The station opened in August 1861 by the North Eastern Railway. It was situated at the end of a minor road. Some timetabled misspelled it as 'Twizel'. To the south was the goods yard, which opened in the 1880s. A goods siding was installed in 1882. On the up side of the line was a signal box, which opened in 1880, and was rebuilt from timber in 1900. In 1951 only 537 tickets were sold. On 9 December 1953, the station was downgraded to an unstaffed halt and the goods yard closed. The last passenger train called on 2 July 1955, with the station closing two days later.

References

External links 

Disused railway stations in Northumberland
Former North Eastern Railway (UK) stations
Railway stations in Great Britain opened in 1861
Railway stations in Great Britain closed in 1955
1861 establishments in England
1955 disestablishments in England